One Race Films (also simply known as One Race Productions) is an American film and multimedia production company. It is based in Studio City, California, and primarily produces feature films. Through its subsidiaries Tigon Studios and Racetrack Records, the company also produces video games and houses a record label. One Race has currently released a total of 15 feature films, all of which star Vin Diesel, who founded the company in 1995.

As of October 2017, its feature films have grossed over $3 billion worldwide, with a $231.3 million average gross per film. The company's films, especially in Fast & Furious franchise, rank among the highest grossing of all time, while the series itself is among the highest-grossing of all time. Although the studio has traditionally made action films, Diesel has also featured in dramas and independent films. The studio's films are typically distributed by Universal Pictures. His production company signed a first-look deal with Universal in 2011.

Filmography

Film

References

External links

Mass media companies established in 1995
Film and video technology
Video production companies
1995 establishments in California
Film production companies of the United States
American film studios